The Yellowstone River is a  river in Iowa and Lafayette counties in the U.S. state of Wisconsin. The river's source is in rural Iowa County east of Mineral Point, and its mouth is at the East Branch Pecatonica River northwest of Argyle.

The river is dammed at Yellowstone Lake, a popular fishing area which is protected as Yellowstone Lake State Park. An additional  of its watershed is part of the Yellowstone Wildlife Area.

References

Rivers of Wisconsin
Rivers of Iowa County, Wisconsin
Rivers of Lafayette County, Wisconsin